Ivona Pavićević  (born 21 April 1996) is a Montenegrin handball player for ŽRK Budućnost Podgorica and the Montenegrin national team.

International honours 
EHF Champions League: 
Semifinalist: 2016, 2017

References

External links

1996 births
Living people
Montenegrin female handball players
Sportspeople from Podgorica
Olympic handball players of Montenegro
Handball players at the 2020 Summer Olympics
Expatriate handball players 
Montenegrin expatriate sportspeople in Romania
Mediterranean Games medalists in handball
Mediterranean Games silver medalists for Montenegro
Competitors at the 2018 Mediterranean Games